Monica Mayhem (born 14 March 1978) is an Australian former pornographic actress, dancer and singer.

Early life
Mayhem was born in Brisbane, Queensland, Australia and she is half Australian and half Welsh. She attended Kenmore State High School but was expelled. Prior to working in porn, she worked in financial markets and futures trading in Sydney. She then moved to London and worked in an International Petroleum Exchange brokerage.

Career
Mayhem began her career in the adult entertainment industry as a dancer at the Spearmint Rhino on Tottenham Court Road. In December 2000, she moved to the United States (allegedly on a dare) to begin acting in pornographic films. Her first scene was with Lee Stone in Real Sex Magazine 38. In 2002, she won the XRCO Award for Starlet of the Year and the FOXE Award for "Vixen of the Year".

Outside pornographic films, Mayhem was a singer/guitarist in the all-girl metal band "Sweet Avenge".

In 2008, she appeared in a small role in the Sex and the City film, in which she is seen through a window having sex with Samantha's neighbour Dante.

Mayhem wrote an autobiography titled Absolute Mayhem: Confessions of an Aussie Porn Star, which was released by Random House Australia in 2009 in her native Australia and by Skyhorse Publishing in North America the following year. A French translation was published in 2011 by Camion Noir.

In August 2010, she announced that she had retired from pornographic acting, after over 400 films, and that she was engaged to a Sydney veterinarian.

References

External links

 
 
 
 
 

1978 births
21st-century Australian women writers
21st-century Australian writers
Australian female erotic dancers
Australian pornographic film actresses
Australian people of Welsh descent
Women heavy metal singers
Living people
People from Brisbane
21st-century Australian women singers
American women guitarists
American guitarists